Kosgei, also written Kosgey and Koskei, is a surname of Kenyan origin that may refer to:

Politicians
Felix Koskei (born 1964), Kenyan politician and Cabinet Secretary for Agriculture, Livestock and Fisheries. He is currently on suspension following corruption claims against him.
Henry Kosgey (born 1947), Kenyan politician and Chairman of the Orange Democratic Movement
Sally Kosgei, Kenyan politician and National Assembly Member for the Orange Democratic Movement

Runners
Abraham Kosgei Chebii (born 1979), Kenyan long-distance runner and World Cross Country medallist
Anne Kosgei (born 1980), Kenyan marathon runner and Venice Marathon winner
Benjamin Kimutai Koskei (born 1971), Kenyan marathon runner and 2002 Amsterdam Marathon winner
Brigid Kosgei (born 1994), Kenyan long-distance runner and 2019 London Marathon winner
Christopher Koskei (born 1974), Kenyan steeplechase runner and 1999 world champion
Elijah Kosgei (born 1986), Kenyan 800 metres runner competing for Qatar as Majed Saeed Sultan
Hosea Kosgei (born 1989), Kenyan long-distance track runner competing for Bahrain as Aadam Ismaeel Khamis
Irene Jerotich Kosgei (born 1974), Kenyan marathon runner and 2010 Commonwealth Games champion
James Koskei (born 1968), Kenyan road runner competing mainly in American races
Japhet Kosgei (born 1968), Kenyan marathon runner and 2000 Tokyo Marathon winner
John Kosgei (born 1973), Kenyan steeplechase runner and 1998 Commonwealth Games champion
Jonathan Kosgei Kipkorir (born 1982), Kenyan marathon runner and two-time Venice Marathon winner
Joseph Kosgei (born 1974), Kenyan cross country runner
Mark Kosgey Kiptoo (born 1976), Kenyan long-distance track runner and 2012 African champion
Michael Kosgei Rotich (born 1982), Kenyan marathon runner and 1992 Paris Marathon winner
Paul Malakwen Kosgei (born 1978), Kenyan long-distance runner and 2002 world champion in the half marathon
Reuben Kosgei (born 1979), Kenyan steeplechase runner and 2000 Olympic champion
Rose Kosgei (born 1981), Kenyan road runner
Salina Kosgei (born 1976), Kenyan marathon runner and 2009 Boston Marathon winner
Sammy Koskei (born 1961), Kenyan 800 metres runner and 1984 African champion
Samuel Kiplimo Kosgei (born 1986), Kenyan road runner and former 25K world record holder
Shadrack Kosgei (born 1984), Kenyan cross country runner
Stephen Kosgei Kibet (born 1986), Kenyan half marathon runner
Vincent Kiplangat Kosgei (born 1985), Kenyan Olympic 400 metres hurdler
Wilson Kosgei Kipketer (born 1972), Kenyan 800 metres runner and three-time world champion for Denmark

Special needs education teachers
Ian Kosgei Misigo (born 1995), Special needs education activist

See also
Kipkosgei, name meaning "son of Kosgei"
Chepkosgei, name meaning "daughter of Kosgei"
Mohammed Al-Salhi (born 1986), Kenyan 800 metres runner competing for Saudi Arabia whose former name was Kosgei

Kalenjin names